Manufacturers of fly tying materials and tools produce products specifically designed for tying artificial flies used in fly fishing.  For the most part, the materials and tools from manufacturers are sold to fly tyers through fly fishing retail outlets, both brick and mortar and online stores that buy in bulk from the manufacturers.  The manufacturing companies are headquartered primarily in the United States, United Kingdom, Japan, Italy, France, and China.  The types of materials and tools that are produced include specialized fly tying hooks, metal and glass beads, feathers, thread, dubbing (animal or synthetic fibers used to coat threads), tinsel, wire, chenille, fly tying vises, tools to assist in manipulating materials, and a variety of other synthetic materials used in fly tying.  Processing of animal hair and fur for fly tying, as well as hand tied flies is done on a smaller scale by independent companies or professional fly tyers.

Manufacturers of fly tying materials
Only the largest and most notable manufacturing companies around the world are included in the table below. These tables do not include the plethora of small companies and individuals that sell small stocks of materials to retailers or retail stores.  Almost all beads are made in China, where the supply of tungsten and nickel are high.  The catalogs of retailers have been used as references to identify notable manufacturers.  The types of materials that the companies make, the location of the company headquarters, and year of founding are listed when known.

Manufacturers of fly tying tools
The types of tools that the companies manufacture, the location of the company headquarters, and year of founding are listed when known.  The products manufactured include fly tying vises, scissors, tweezers, bobbin holders, bodkins, and hair stackers. The following are the major manufacturers of tools used in fly tying:

Retailers
Fly shops sell materials and tools for fly tying, fly fishing tackle, hand made flies, and fly fishing clothing.  Some of the retailers of fly tying materials and tools include:
54 Dean Street, Italy
Flyshop New Zealand, New Zealand
J. Stockyards Fly Fishing, US
Lords of Rivers, France
Orvis, Sunderland, Vermont, US; founded in 1856 
Parks' Fly Shop
The Fly Stop, San Diego, California
The Fly Shack, US
The Fly Tying Company, London, UK
Reel Flies, UK
A Blaze in the Northern Fly, Qualicum Beach, BC, Canada />

References

Artificial flies
Fishing equipment manufacturers
Lists of manufacturers